Belk Hudson Lofts (also known as Fowler's Department Store or the Lowe-Kilgore Building) is an apartment building in Huntsville, Alabama.  Originally two buildings, the first was built on the corner of Washington Street and Holmes Avenue in 1930 to house Fowler's Department Store, one of several department stores on Washington Street (including Dunnavant's and Kress).  The second building, adjacent to the first along Holmes, was constructed in 1936 as a farm supply store.  Fowler's went bankrupt in 1938, and Belk Husdon purchased the corner building in 1940.  Beginning in 1944, they also leased the Holmes building, and the two were joined.  After Belk Husdon left the downtown area, the building was renovated into offices in the 1980s.  The one-story Holmes building was occupied by Olde Towne Brewing Company from 2004 until 2007, when the building was destroyed by fire.  In the 2010s, the corner building was reconstructed into a loft apartment building, with the original façade kept largely intact.

The building was listed on the National Register of Historic Places in 1996.

References

National Register of Historic Places in Huntsville, Alabama
Commercial buildings on the National Register of Historic Places in Alabama
Buildings designated early commercial in the National Register of Historic Places
Commercial buildings completed in 1930
Buildings and structures in Huntsville, Alabama
Apartment buildings in Alabama